Burcei is a comune (municipality) in the Province of South Sardinia in the Italian region Sardinia, located about  northeast of Cagliari.

Burcei borders the following municipalities: San Vito, Sinnai, Villasalto.

References 

Cities and towns in Sardinia